Johannes Hermanus Hugo 'Boland' Coetzee  (born 20 January 1945) is a former South African rugby union player. He is a wine farmer and winemaker at his farm Vriesenhof, in the Stellenbosch region.

Playing career
Coetzee enrolled at Stellenbosch University in 1963 for a degree in Oenology and started playing rugby for the university's under 18 team, of which he was also captain. He continued to play for the Maties rugby club and was also their captain on a regular basis until 1979. Coetzee made his provincial debut for Western Province in 1967 and played in 127 matches, scoring 37 tries for the union.

Coetzee made his test debut for the Springboks in the first test against the 1974 British Lions at Newlands in Cape Town. He was dropped from the team after the first test and his second test for the Springboks was as a replacement for Moaner van Heerden in the second half of the second test against France in 1975. Coetzee then played in all four test in the 1976 series against the All Blacks.

Test history

See also
List of South Africa national rugby union players – Springbok no. 463

References

1945 births
Living people
South African rugby union players
South Africa international rugby union players
Stellenbosch University alumni
Western Province (rugby union) players
People from Bergrivier Local Municipality
Rugby union players from the Western Cape
Rugby union flankers